Grażyna Maria Bernatowicz (born 12 March 1946 in Warsaw) is a Polish diplomat and political scientist. She was the Undersecretary of State at the Ministry of Foreign Affairs of Poland from 2000 to 2002, and again from 2007 to 2013. She has been the Polish ambassador to Spain and Andorra (2002–2007), and to the Czech Republic (2013–2017).

Life and career
In 1968, Bernatowicz graduated from the Faculty of Law at the University of Warsaw. In 1975 she obtained a doctoral degree in law there, with a doctoral dissertation entitled Wewnętrznych i zewnętrznych uwarunkowań polityki zagranicznej Hiszpanii (Internal and external determinants of Spanish foreign policy). In 1992, she was awarded a Habilitation in humanities with a specialization in political science.

After obtaining her doctoral dissertation, Bernatowicz became a professor in the Faculty of Law of the Polish Institute of International Affairs. In 1995, she became a professor at the Helena Chodkowska University (pl).

Beginning in 1993, Bernatowicz joined the Polish Ministry of Foreign Affairs. There she first worked as an advisor to the minister and deputy director of the Strategic Research Department, and in 1998 became a coordinator of issues related to European integration. From 2000 to 2002, she was the Undersecretary of State in the Ministry of Foreign Affairs.

In April 2002, Bernatowicz was appointed by the President of Poland to be Ambassador to Spain and Andorra. She served in this role until 2007, when she was re-appointed to the office of the Undersecretary of State at the Ministry of Foreign Affairs.

In 2013, Bernatowicz was appointed Poland's ambassador to the Czech Republic, and retired in 2017.

Selected Awards and Honours
Portuguese Order of Merit, 2008
Order of Merit of the Republic of Hungary, 2009
Maltese Order of Merit, 2010
Commandeur of the Order of Saint-Charles, Monaco, 2012
Royal Norwegian Order of Merit, 2012
Officer of the Order of the Rebirth of Poland, 2013

References

Living people
Ambassadors of Poland to the Czech Republic
Polish women ambassadors
1946 births
People from Warsaw
Women political scientists
Ambassadors of Poland to Spain
University of Warsaw alumni
Polish legal scholars
Polish political scientists
Officers of the Order of Polonia Restituta
Recipients of the National Order of Merit (Malta)
Commanders of the Order of Saint-Charles
Grand Officers of the Order of Prince Henry
Grand Crosses of the Order of Merit (Portugal)
Commander's Crosses of the Order of Merit of the Republic of Hungary (civil)